Kristiansund BK is a Norwegian football club located in Kristiansund that currently plays in Eliteserien. The team plays its home matches in the 4,444-capacity Kristiansund Stadion.

Kristiansund BK was formed in the autumn of 2003, when two rival clubs of Kristiansund, Kristiansund FK and Clausenengen FK, agreed to establish a new elite team.

History

Background
Since Magnar Isaksen won a bronze medal in the 1936 Summer Olympics, many footballers from Kristiansund have played for the Norwegian national team, including Ole Gunnar Solskjær, Øyvind Leonhardsen, Trond Andersen, Ole Stavrum and Georg Hammer. In addition, players like Ola Lyngvær, Jan Erlend Kruse, Arild Stavrum, Ole Erik Stavrum, André Flem and Christian Michelsen have played for different clubs in the Norwegian top division, and Clausenengen has been called a "talent factory". Nevertheless, the football clubs from Kristiansund have had limited success, with Kristiansund FK's spell in the 1. divisjon in 1991 and Clausenengen in 1999 as the most recent.

2003–2004: Founding and development
Kristiansund BK was founded on 2 September 2003 and replaced Kristiansund FK in the 3. divisjon, with the other two clubs continuing to play in the lower divisions. Atlanten Stadion was chosen as the club's first home ground and Erik Brakstad was appointed as the club's first head coach.

The club finished their 2004 debut season in second place behind Træff in their 3. divisjon group 18.

2005–2016: Promotions
In 2005, Kristiansund won promotion to the 2. divisjon after beating Volda in the 4–2 win on aggregate in the promotion play-offs. Brakstad left his position as head coach after the promotion and Ole Gunnar Iversen took over. In 2006, Kristiansund finished seventh in their first season in the 2. divisjon. In 2007, Kristiansund moved to Omsundet at Frei due to the poor turf conditions at Atlanten Stadion. Ahead of the 2007 season, Geir Midtsian replaced Ole Gunnar Iversen as head coach and with New Zealand international Kris Bright on the team, who scored 23 goals in 26 matches for the club, Kristiansund BK started to look like a contender for promotion and finished fifth in 2007 and fourth in 2008. The team also eliminated Rosenborg in the second round of the 2008 Norwegian Football Cup.

After finishing third in 2009, the club's goal was promotion to the 1. divisjon, and in March 2010 Kristiansund BK and Surnadal IL started a partnership with Molde FK for developing local players. In August 2010 Molde FK loaned out Elias Valderhaug and Jacob Falch Meidell to Kristiansund BK to help out in the race for promotion, but the team finished second behind Hødd. After suffering bad results in the beginning of the 2011 season, Midtsian decided to withdraw as head coach in July 2011, while his assistants Per Eirik Bentz and Torgeir Fredly were left in charge until the club hired a new head coach. From July 2011, Erling Moe took charge of the team in the second half of the season and the team's results improved, leading to a second-place finish behind Bærum.

On 10 November 2011, Kristiansund BK announced that they had hired Geir Bakke, who had previously worked as assistant coach at the first-tier clubs Vålerenga and Stabæk, as head coach starting from 1 January 2012. After playing 21 matches without losing, the club was promoted to the 1. divisjon on 16 September 2012, as winners of their 2012 2. divisjon group. Christian Michelsen succeeded Bakke as head coach in 2014. The club moved to Kristiansund Stadion in 2014 after several years playing at Idrettsplassen. After making the play-offs rounds in the 2014 and 2015 seasons of the 1. divisjon, Kristiansund BK were promoted to Eliteserien after finishing in first place in 2016.

2017– : First Eliteserien seasons
Kristiansund began their spell in the top division with a surprising seventh-place finish in their debut season. The team also reached the quarter-finals of the 2017 Norwegian Football Cup, the first time in club history they played the quarter-finals stage, where they were eliminated by local rivals Molde on away ground. The 2018 Eliteserien saw Kristiansund record their best ever league achievement: A fifth place with 46 points.

Recent seasons 

{|class="wikitable"
|-bgcolor="#efefef"
! Season
! Division
! Pos.
! Pl.
! W
! D
! L
! GS
! GA
! Pts.
!Cup
!Notes
|-
|2010
|2. divisjon 
|align=right |2
|align=right|26||align=right|17||align=right|4||align=right|5
|align=right|60||align=right|35||align=right|55
||Second round
|
|-
|2011 
|2. divisjon (gr. 2)
|align=right |2
|align=right|24||align=right|15||align=right|3||align=right|6
|align=right|55||align=right|29||align=right|48
||Second round
|
|-
|2012 
|2. divisjon (gr. 2)
|align=right bgcolor=#DDFFDD| 1
|align=right|26||align=right|22||align=right|2||align=right|2
|align=right|77||align=right|18||align=right|68
||Second round
|Promoted
|-
|2013 
|1. divisjon
|align=right |9
|align=right|30||align=right|12||align=right|6||align=right|12
|align=right|47||align=right|44||align=right|42
||Second round
|
|-
|2014  
|1. divisjon
|align=right |4
|align=right|30||align=right|13||align=right|10||align=right|7
|align=right|53||align=right|39||align=right|49
||Third round
|
|-
|2015  
|1. divisjon
|align=right |3
|align=right|30||align=right|14||align=right|7||align=right|9
|align=right|37||align=right|30||align=right|49
||Fourth round
|
|-
|2016  
|1. divisjon
|align=right bgcolor=#DDFFDD| 1
|align=right|30||align=right|19||align=right|5||align=right|6
|align=right|47||align=right|30||align=right|62
||First round
|Promoted
|-
|2017  
|Eliteserien
|align=right |7
|align=right|30||align=right|10||align=right|10||align=right|10
|align=right|44||align=right|46||align=right|40
||Quarter-final
|
|-
|2018   
|Eliteserien
|align=right |5
|align=right|30||align=right|13||align=right|7||align=right|10
|align=right|46||align=right|41||align=right|46
||Third round
|
|-
|2019   
|Eliteserien
|align=right |6
|align=right|30||align=right|11||align=right|8||align=right|11
|align=right|41||align=right|41||align=right|41
||Fourth round
|
|-
|2020 
|Eliteserien
|align=right |5
|align=right|30||align=right|12||align=right|12||align=right|6
|align=right|57||align=right|45||align=right|48
||Cancelled
|
|-
|2021 
|Eliteserien
|align=right |6
|align=right|30||align=right|14||align=right|4||align=right|12
|align=right|41||align=right|46||align=right|46
||Third round
|
|-
|2022 
|Eliteserien
|align=right bgcolor="#FFCCCC"| 15
|align=right|30||align=right|5||align=right|8||align=right|17
|align=right|37||align=right|60||align=right|23
||Third round
|Relegated
|}

Players

Current squad

 

For season transfers, see transfers winter 2022–23 and transfers summer 2023.

Out on loan

History of head coaches

History of league positions

References

External links
 Official website

 
Eliteserien clubs
Sport in Kristiansund
Association football clubs established in 2003
2003 establishments in Norway